The 22601 / 22602 Chennai Central–Sainagar Shirdi Express is a Superfast Express train belonging to Indian Railways' Southern Railway zone that run between Chennai Central and  in India. This is the only train that connects Chennai with Dharmavaram, Ananthapur, Ahmadnagar and Shirdi.

Service 

Coaches

The 22601 / 02 Chennai Central–Sainagar Shirdi Superfast Express has Three AC 2 Tier, Three AC 3 Tier, 13 Sleeper Class, 3 General Unreserved & Two SLR (seating with luggage rake) coaches. It doesn't carry a pantry car. As with most train services in India, coach composition may be amended at the discretion of Indian Railways depending on demand.

Routing

Traction
Because this route is fully electrified, a Royapuram-based Electric locomotive WAP-7 loco pulls the train to its destination.

References

External links
22601 Chennai Central Sainagar Shirdi Express at India Rail Info
22602 Sainagar Shirdi Chennai Central Express at India Rail Info

Express trains in India
Rail transport in Tamil Nadu
Rail transport in Andhra Pradesh
Rail transport in Karnataka
Rail transport in Maharashtra
Transport in Chennai
Transport in Shirdi